The 2014 WAFL season was the 130th season of the various incarnations of the West Australian Football League (WAFL). The season began on 22 March 2014 and concluded on 21 September 2014 with the 2014 WAFL Grand Final. West Perth entered the season as reigning premiers after defeating East Perth by 49 points in the 2013 WAFL Grand Final at Patersons Stadium.

The 2014 season was the first to feature Western Australia’s professional AFL clubs West Coast and Fremantle engage in direct alignments with East Perth and Peel Thunder respectively.

Subiaco were the premiers for the 2014 season, after they defeated favourites East Perth by 16 points at Patersons Stadium.

Clubs

Premiership season fixtures
Source: WAFL 2014 season fixtures and results

Round 1

After their big win, Perth found themselves on top of the ladder for the first time since the corresponding fixture of 2008. Over the next 22 rounds of football the Demons occupied all nine spots on the WAFL league ladder, becoming the first team to achieve this. Their ladder positions after each round were 1, 2, 3, 4, 6, 6, 4, 5, 6, 6, 7, 6, 7, 7, 7, 8, 8, 8, 9, 9, 9, 9, 9.

Round 2

Round 3

Round 4

Round 5

Round 6

Round 7

Round 8

Round 9

Round 10

Round 11

Round 12

Round 13

Round 14

Round 15

Round 16

Round 17

Round 18

Round 19

Round 20

Round 21

Round 22

Round 23

Ladder

Finals series

Semi-finals

Preliminary final

Grand Final

Foxtel Cup

The two 2013 Grand Finalists West Perth and East Perth were invited to compete in the Foxtel Cup knockout competition in 2014. Their performances are shown below:

Round 1

Semi-finals

Grand Final

State game
The WAFL representative team competed against the North East Australian Football League (NEAFL) representative team on May 24 in Sydney.

Awards
 The Sandover Medal (awarded to the fairest and best player of the home and away season) was won by Aaron Black, who polled 47 votes, only 1 vote ahead of Luke Blackwell and Shane Nelson.
 The Bernie Naylor Medal (for the leading goalkicker in the home and away season) was won by Ben Saunders, who kicked 59 goals in 20 home and away matches.
 Brian Dawson received the JJ Leonard Medal as the Coach of the Year after guiding the Royals to a second straight grand final, and his fourth in five seasons as a league coach.
 The Subiaco Football Club were awarded the Rodriguez Shield, as the team with the best combined record at league, reserves and senior colts level in the 2014 season.
They defeated  on a score of 5.9 (39) def. 3.7 (25).
They defeated  on a score of 11.9 (75) def. 7.13 (55).

References

External links
Official WAFL website

West Australian Football League seasons
WAFL